D.C. Hall can either refer to 
 Warren D. C. Hall - American and Mexican lawyer, pioneer, and soldier
 D. C. Hall - Oklahoma basketball coach